The Making of Me was a 1989 film about conception and birth directed by Glenn Gordon Caron and starring Martin Short. It was shown in the Wonders of Life pavilion at Walt Disney World Resort's Epcot when the pavilion was open. As of 2007, the theater remains open during the International Food & Wine Festival; however, the film being shown is about food.

Description
Martin Short tells the story about how we are born, by explaining how his parents met during the course of their lives - at a high school dance, getting married, on their honeymoon, and having their first child.

The film also explains the process of fertilization between sperm and egg cells in an animated segment that lasts about 1 minute and 30 seconds, as well as fetal development by using imagery taken by Lennart Nilsson (previously appeared in Nova's "Miracle of Life".)

The attraction closed along with the rest of the pavilion on January 1, 2007.  During the 2007 Epcot Food & Wine Festival, the marquee located outside the theater was covered by a curtain. During 2008, it was once again visible, but the film did not show.

From 2008 onward, the theater has been used to screen "Seasons of the Vine", a film previously shown at Disney's California Adventure, during the Food and Wine Festival. During the Flower and Garden Festival, the theater is called The Garden Theatre.

Issues
According to producers, the film was "...somewhat a departure for a Disney attraction", and mentions that the film "may elicit controversy" in regards to the issue of abortion; fortunately, the intent was "to not walk into the teeth of the (abortion) issue."

Given that birth and conception is a sensitive issue around families, an advisory sign was placed near the entrance to the theater, in order to advise parents to decide whether the film is suitable for their children.

See also
 Epcot attraction and entertainment history
 Wonders of Life

References

External links
 

Amusement rides introduced in 1989
Amusement rides that closed in 2007
Former Walt Disney Parks and Resorts attractions
Epcot
1989 films
Walt Disney Parks and Resorts films
Future World (Epcot)
Films directed by Glenn Gordon Caron
Films about abortion
Films about babies
American films with live action and animation